Noel Gertrude Oxenbury (December 25, 1918 – January 29, 2012), later known by her married name Noel Morrow, was a Canadian swimmer who competed at the 1936 Summer Olympics in Berlin in the 100-metre backstroke event, but was eliminated in the first round. Two years later she competed at the 1938 British Empire Games in Sydney and won a gold medal in the 4×110-yard freestyle relay alongside Phyllis Dewar, Dorothy Lyon and Mary Baggaley. She also placed fourth in the 3×110-yard medley relay with Baggaley and Joan Langdon and competed in the 110 yd backstroke.  She was born in New Westminster, British Columbia. Since 2004 she has competed in backstroke events at Canadian Masters Championships and won a gold medal in the 100m backstroke event in the 90-94 age classification. On October 4, 2003, she was inducted as a member of the Swim B.C. Hall of Fame.

References

External links
 
 
 
 

1918 births
2012 deaths
Canadian female backstroke swimmers
Canadian female freestyle swimmers
Olympic swimmers of Canada
Commonwealth Games gold medallists for Canada
Sportspeople from New Westminster
Swimmers at the 1936 Summer Olympics
Swimmers at the 1938 British Empire Games
Commonwealth Games medallists in swimming
Medallists at the 1938 British Empire Games